Xagar District is an administrative district in southern Somalia. It is one of five districts that make up the Jubbada Hoose region.

References
Xagar, Somalia Page

External links
Map

 

Districts of Somalia
Lower Juba